SCERT may refer to:

 State Council of Educational Research and Training, Kerala
 State Council of Educational Research and Training, Delhi